"You Can Depend on Me" is a song written by Ronnie Rogers and Jimmy Griffin, and recorded by American country music group Restless Heart. It was released in October 1991 as the first single from their compilation album The Best of Restless Heart. The song reached number 3 on the Billboard Hot Country Singles & Tracks chart.

Critical reception
Deborah Evans Price, of Billboard magazine reviewed the song favorably, saying that "instant harmonies are vibrant as well as graceful in delivery." She goes on to say that the production has a "different edge" and that the arrangement is "excellent."

Chart performance
"You Can Depend on Me" debuted on the U.S. Billboard Hot Country Singles & Tracks for the week of October 19, 1991.

Year-end charts

References

1992 singles
Restless Heart songs
Songs written by Ronnie Rogers
Song recordings produced by Josh Leo
Songs written by Jimmy Griffin
RCA Records Nashville singles
1991 songs